Ziaur Rahman (or Ziawrahman Sharifi, born 17 October 1998) is an Afghan cricketer. He made his international debut for the Afghanistan cricket team in February 2019.

Career
He made his List A debut for Speen Ghar Region in the 2017 Ghazi Amanullah Khan Regional One Day Tournament on 16 August 2017. He made his first-class debut for Mis Ainak Region in the 2017–18 Ahmad Shah Abdali 4-day Tournament on 1 December 2017. He made his Twenty20 debut for Paktia Panthers in the 2018–19 Afghanistan Premier League on 10 October 2018.

In February 2019, he was named in Afghanistan's Twenty20 International (T20I) squad for their series against Ireland in India. He made his T20I debut for Afghanistan against Ireland on 24 February 2019.

References

External links
 

1998 births
Living people
Afghan cricketers
Afghanistan Twenty20 International cricketers
Mis Ainak Knights cricketers
Paktia Panthers cricketers
Spin Ghar Tigers cricketers
Place of birth missing (living people)